Yudaya Nakayenze (born 4 June 1997) is a Ugandan professional footballer who plays as a midfielder for the Uganda women's national team.

International career
On 21 July 2018, Nakayenze scored a 75th minute winning goal via a header for Uganda as they defeated Ethiopia by 2–1 in the 2018 CECAFA Women's Championship in Rwanda.

Nakayenze featured for the Ugandan national team during the 2016 and 2018 CECAFA Women's championship. She also played in the 2020 Tokyo Olympics Qualifiers against Ethiopia.

International goals
Scores and results list Uganda goal tally first

References

External links 

Seminole State player profile
Lindsey Wilson 2020–21 player profile
Lindsey Wilson 2021 player profile

1997 births
Living people
Sportspeople from Kampala
People from Mbale District
Ugandan women's footballers
Women's association football forwards
Women's association football midfielders
Seminole State Trojans athletes
College women's soccer players in the United States
Lindsey Wilson Blue Raiders women's soccer players
Uganda women's international footballers
Ugandan expatriate women's footballers
Ugandan expatriate sportspeople in the United States
Expatriate women's soccer players in the United States